IIRC may refer to:

 IIRC, an initialism for "If I Remember Correctly" or "If I Recall Correctly"
 International Integrated Reporting Council
 IIRC, a reporting mark for Indiana Interstate Railway
 International Interdisciplinary Research Center, Sigmund Freud University Vienna, Austria